The Village of Love (Persian: Dehkadeh eshq) is a 1950 Iranian film directed by Ahmad Afsaneh.

References

Bibliography 
 Mohammad Ali Issari. Cinema in Iran, 1900-1979. Scarecrow Press, 1989.

External links 
 

1950 films
1950s Persian-language films
Iranian black-and-white films